Clazosentan (INN, trade name Pivlaz) is a drug belonging to the class of endothelin receptor antagonists.

Mechanism 
The endothelin 1 receptor is one of the strongest known vasoconstrictors. After subarachnoidal bleedings, irritation of the blood vessels can lead to a vasospasm and thus to an ischaemia, an insufficient blood supply to brain tissue. One possible effect of this is, in turn, an ischaemic stroke.

Trials 
In a randomized trial with patients who had aneurysmal subarachnoid bleeding and were being treated with endovascular coiling, 15 mg/h clazosentan significantly reduced vasospasm-related morbidity and all-cause mortality. Clazosentan, however, did not improve the neurological outcome as measured by the extended Glascow Outcome Scale.

References 

Endothelin receptor antagonists
Vasodilators
Tetrazoles
Pyridines
Sulfonamides
Pyrimidines
Methoxy compounds
Diaryl ethers